Primary were an Australian electronic rock band which formed in 1995 the Fonti brothers: Jamie on keyboards and Sean on bass guitar (both ex-Caligula), and Connie Mitchell on lead vocals. According to Australian musicologist, Ian McFarlane, the group were "Dominated by South African-born [Mitchell]'s hyperactive and full-frontal vocals, with thunderous electronic rock underpinning the music, Primary sounded like a techno Skunk Anansie. Jamie Fonti coined the phrase 'Hybrid Electronica Rock' in order to describe the band's sound." The group released two albums, This Is the Sound (June 1999) and Watching the World (28 May 2001). They disbanded late in 2003.

History 

Primary formed in 1995 in Sydney as a techno rock group by the Fonti brothers Jamie on keyboards and Sean on bass guitar (both ex-Caligula), and Connie Mitchell on lead vocals. The Fontis had played in My Heart Bleeds for You, a mid-1980s punk, hardcore band. Sean was then in Massappeal (1987–90), Caligula from (1989-94) and Def FX (1995–97). The Fonti brothers had met Mitchell in a recording studio in 1994, while they recorded demo tracks for Caligula. When that project finished Jamie and Mitchell started writing tracks together while Sean was a member of Def FX.

Primary's first recording, a five-track extended play, Vicious Precious, produced by Paul McKercher and Ollie J, was released in March 1998, and featured Paul Wheeler (ex-Icehouse) on drums. At the ARIA Music Awards of 1998, "Vicious Precious" was nominated for ARIA Award for Breakthrough Artist – Single.

Bousfield left the band in 1999.

Nick Launay produced the band's first full-length album, This Is the Sound, which appeared in June that year on WEA/Warner. It peaked in the ARIA Albums Chart top 40. Australian musicologist, Ian McFarlane, felt it was "an accomplished album that boasted state-of-the-art production values, and a batch of reverberating tracks." He described how the group were "Dominated by South African-born [Mitchell]'s hyperactive and full-frontal vocals, with thunderous electronic rock underpinning the music, Primary sounded like a techno Skunk Anansie. Jamie Fonti coined the phrase 'Hybrid Electronica Rock' in order to describe the band's sound."

Jason Howard joined Primary on lead guitar and made his performance debut in April 1999. They became known for their energetic live shows, with Mitchell's on-stage presence and costumes a talking point. Their second album, Watching the World, was released on 28 May 2001. Australian music journalist, Ed Nimmervoll, declared it to be his Album of the Week: "they kept the focus on the songs. In the end Primary offer music with many layers of interest. [Mitchell]'s lyrics are a strong counterpoint to the depth of the band's music."

The band announced on their website on 24 April 2002 that they were recording demos for a proposed third album, but it was not released. They played a gig in November 2003 at the Annandale Hotel. Mitchell joined Sneaky Sound System in 2004 ahead of their self-titled album.

Discography

Studio albums

Extended plays

Singles

Awards and nominations

ARIA Music Awards
The ARIA Music Awards is an annual awards ceremony that recognises excellence, innovation, and achievement across all genres of Australian music. They commenced in 1987.

! 
|-
|1998
| "Vicious Precious"
| ARIA Award for Breakthrough Artist - Single
| 
|
|-
|rowspan="2"|1999
|rowspan="2"| Nick Launay for "Supposed to Be Here", "24000", "This Is the Sound" and "Come to Take You Home"
| ARIA Award for Producer of the Year
| 
|rowspan="2"|
|-
| ARIA Award for Engineer of the Year
|

References 

Australian rock music groups
Australian electronic musicians
Musical groups established in 1995
Musical groups disestablished in 2003
Musical groups from Sydney